Dasolsa station is a railway station in South Korea. It is on the Gyeongjeon Line.

Further reading
철도청 고시 제6호(1968.01.16) 
대한민국관보 철도청고시 제27,28호, 1986년 10월 4일 
대한민국관보 철도청고시 제1999-25호, 1999년 7월 13일

Railway stations in South Gyeongsang Province